Sloche were a 1970s progressive rock band from Quebec, Canada.

The band's name comes from the word used in Quebec for wet snow. It is an English word, 'slush', but is written so as to sound the same in French.

History
Sloche was formed in about 1971.  The band went through a number of personnel changes before recording their first album, J'Un Oeil, in 1975.  The tracks received some radio play in parts of Quebec.

Their album called J'Un Oeil featured Rejean Yacola on electric and acoustic pianos, Fender Rhodes and Wurlitzer electric pianos, Clavinet, Minimoog, percussion and vocals, Martin Murray on Hammond B3 Organ, Minimoog, Wurlitzer and Solina pianos, saxophone, percussion and vocals, Carol Berard on acoustic and electric guitars, percussion and vocals, Pierre Hébert on bass, percussion and vocals and Gilles Chiasson on drums. 

In 1976 the band released their second and final album, Stadaconé; the sound was a mixture of rock and funk.

In 2009 the two albums were remastered and re-released on CDs.

Discography
J'un Oeil (1975)
Stadaconé (1976)

References

Musical groups with year of establishment missing
Musical groups from Quebec
Canadian progressive rock groups
Jazz fusion ensembles